Sa Re Ga Ma Pa is an Indian Hindi-language reality singing television show. It started airing on Zee TV in 1995 as Sa Re Ga Ma. It is the oldest running game show in India as well as the oldest show on private television in India. The name of the show is derived from the first five notes in the octave of classical Indian music.

History
The first episode aired on 1 May 1995 and was hosted by Sonu Nigam. In the year 2000, the show was hosted by the Bangash brothers, Amaan Ali Bangash and Ayaan Ali Bangash, sons of sarod-player Amjad Ali Khan. From 2002, Shaan started hosting the show. Till 2005, the show used to follow a format wherein experts in the field of music would judge the contestants and score them. The format changed with the advent of Sa Re Ga Ma Pa Challenge 2005 which introduced the judges as mentors of different teams and scoring was primarily dependent on public voting. After Shaan quit hosting the show, the show was hosted by many others like Purab Kohli, Manish Paul, Karan Singh Rathore, Archana Jani, Vipul Roy, Jay Soni and even kids Dhairya Sorecha and Afsha Musani. The most prominent names to host the show in later seasons were Javed Ali and the current host Aditya Narayan.

Overview 
The show has seen multiple variations over the years :
 Sa Re Ga Ma: Contestants were scored only by the expert judges. There were 8 prelim (quarter-final) rounds, each consisting of 2 male singers and 2 female singers. One male winner and one female winner from each show competed in the semifinal rounds. There were 4 semifinal rounds where the 8 male and 8 female prelim winners participated. Each semifinal round had either 4 male or 4 female winners, so there were a total of 4 semifinals (2 semifinals with 4 males and 2 semifinals with 4 female singers). In the finals, the four semifinal winners, 2 male and 2 female competed against each other. Finally one male winner and one female winner became the winners of that season (also called a schedule). 
 Sa Re Ga Ma Pa: 2 male singers, 2 female singers. The male and female winner would return the following episode and compete against a new challenger. At the start of this "roll-over" series, they had initially announced that anyone with over 10 wins would get an album; however, that never materialized.
 Sa Re Ga Ma Pa Challenge: Teams were formed, each Gharana (team) had a judge who mentored them. Elimination was decided by public voting.
 Sa Re Ga Ma Pa Ek Main Aur Ek Tu: A duet singing competition which featured some new contestants as well as old contestants from earlier seasons. Weekly elimination decided by public voting.
 Sa Re Ga Ma Pa L'il Champs: A singing competition for young children, which judges the prodigious kids on the basis of their voice quality, singing talent and versatility in performance.
 Sa Re Ga Ma Pa Challenge USA: The first instalment of Sa Re Ga Ma Pa Challenge series in USA.
 Sa Re Ga Ma Pa Mega Challenge: A special season in which eight teams representing eight different states and consisting of total 24 talented contestants from past seasons of Sa Re Ga Ma Pa participated. The show was made to celebrate the 1000th episode of Sa Re Ga Ma Pa. Notable Indian singers and musicians were roped in to judge each of the episodes.

Other Indian versions 
Due to its success and popularity, it has been remade in languages including Marathi, Bengali, Kannada, Punjabi, Tamil, Telugu, Odia, Bhojpuri and Malayalam.

Seasons

References

Sa Re Ga Ma Pa
Indian reality television series
Zee TV original programming